Jean Lesueur may refer to:

 Jean Le Sueur (1598–1668), French priest
 Jean-François Le Sueur (1760–1837), French composer
 Jean Lesueur (tennis) (1910–1969), French tennis player